Fiona Anne Crackles (born 11 February 2000) is an English field hockey player who plays as a midfielder for the England and Great Britain national teams.

Early life 
She was born 11 February 2000 in Kirkby Lonsdale, Cumbria. She attended Melling St. Wilfrid Primary school and Queen Elizabeth School in Cumbria.

Club career

She plays club hockey in the Women's England Hockey League Division One North for Durham University.

She played overseas for the Queensland Under 21s in the National Championships in June 2019.

International career

She competed in the 2020 Summer Olympics for Great Britain, receiving a bronze medal.

References

External links

2000 births
Living people
English female field hockey players
British female field hockey players
Women's England Hockey League players
Field hockey players at the 2020 Summer Olympics
Olympic field hockey players of Great Britain
Olympic bronze medallists for Great Britain
Medalists at the 2020 Summer Olympics
Olympic medalists in field hockey
Alumni of Collingwood College, Durham
Field hockey players at the 2022 Commonwealth Games
Commonwealth Games gold medallists for England
Commonwealth Games medallists in field hockey
Medallists at the 2022 Commonwealth Games